Alfonsi is a surname. Notable people with the surname include:

François Alfonsi (born 1953), French politician
Lydia Alfonsi (1928–2022), Italian actress
Nicolas Alfonsi (1936–2020), French politician
Paul Alfonsi (1908–1989), American politician
Sharyn Alfonsi (born 1972), American journalist